Michelle Zancarini-Fournel (born 1947) is a French historian. She is professor emeritus of contemporary history at the Claude Bernard University Lyon 1, and former co-director of the semi-annual journal, Clio. Femmes, genre, histoire. Her research focuses on the history of popular movements. She has published books and numerous articles in various journals. She is a specialist in the history of women and gender, as well as May 68.

Biography
Zancarini-Fournel began her career in 1969 as a secondary school teacher.

A specialist in the history of women and gender, Zancarini-Fournel and Françoise Thébaud co-founded the history journal, Clio. 

Zancarini-Fournel also specialized in the topic May 68, whose archives she first helped to save, before writing the history of the event. She also focused on the event in her habilitation dissertation, which was partially published in the book she co-edited  (68: une histoire collective).9. 
 In 2016, she published a popular history of France, entitled  (Struggles and Dreams).

Selected works 
 Parcours de femmes: réalités et représentations, Saint-Étienne (1880-1950), with Mathilde Dubesset, Lyon, Presses universitaires de Lyon, 1993.
 Différence des sexes et protection sociale, XIXe – XXe siècles, with Leora Auslander, Paris, Presses universitaires de Vincennes, 1995.
 Collectif, Le siècle des féminismes, Paris, l'Atelier, 2004.
 Histoire des femmes en France : XIXe – XXe siècles, Rennes, Presses universitaires de Rennes, 2005.
 Le genre du sport, Toulouse, Presses universitaires du Mirail, 2006 , 379 pages.
 68, une histoire collective, 1962-1981, with Philippe Artières, Paris, La Découverte, 2008 , 847 pages.
 Le moment 68 : une histoire contestée, Paris, Le Seuil, 2008 , 313 pages.
 Les luttes et les rêves. Une histoire populaire de la France de 1685 à nos jours, Paris, La Découverte, 2016 , 990 pages.
 Une histoire nationale est-elle encore possible ?, Pessac, Presses universitaires de Bordeaux, 2018 , 80 pages.
 Ne nous libérez pas, on s'en charge.
 De la défense des savoirs critiques: Quand le pouvoir s'en prend à l'autonomie de la recherche, with Claude Gautier, Paris, La Découverte, 2022 , 272 pages.

References

External links

1947 births
Living people
Gender studies academics
20th-century French historians
21st-century French historians
20th-century French non-fiction writers
21st-century French non-fiction writers
20th-century French women writers
21st-century French women writers